Donald Code Brittain,  (June 10, 1928 – July 21, 1989) was a film director and producer with the National Film Board of Canada.

Career
Fields of Sacrifice (1964) is considered Brittain's first major film as director.
His other notable directorial credits include the 1964 feature documentary Bethune, 1965 documentaries Ladies and Gentlemen... Mr. Leonard Cohen and Memorandum and the Genie Award-winning 1979 documentary Paperland: The Bureaucrat Observed. He also directed the first-ever IMAX film, Tiger Child for Expo '70, and Earthwatch, a 70mm film for Expo 86.

He wrote the 1975 Oscar-nominated short documentary Whistling Smith. He co-directed the 1976 feature documentary Volcano: An Inquiry Into the Life and Death of Malcolm Lowry which garnered 6 Canadian Film Awards and an Academy Award nomination.

Brittain also directed the three-part CBC-coproduced series The Champions, chronicling the lives and battles of Canadian political titans René Lévesque and Pierre Elliott Trudeau. His most ambitious project was The King Chronicle, a three-part 1987-88 television series about the remarkable career of Prime Minister William Lyon Mackenzie King.

He won the Gemini Award for best screenplay and direction for the 1985 drama Canada's Sweetheart: The Saga of Hal C. Banks.

As NFB producer, Brittain's credits included Arthur Lipsett's A Trip Down Memory Lane.

Often a narrator of his own documentaries, Brittain also lent his voice to the animated mockumentary What on Earth!

Lifetime achievement awards and posthumous honours
In 1989, Brittain was the recipient of a Margaret Collier Award. In 1990, he was posthumously appointed an Officer of the Order of Canada in recognition of "his masterful visual records of our social and cultural past.

The Donald Brittain Award for the best political or social documentary presented by the Academy of Canadian Cinema and Television at the Gemini Awards and more recently, the Canadian Screen Awards, are named in his honour.

Brittain is interred in Ottawa, Ontario's Beechwood Cemetery.

References

Further reading

External links
 
 Donald Brittain playlist at the National Film Board of Canada
 Donald Brittain at The Canadian Encyclopedia
 Donald Brittain at the Canadian Film Encyclopedia
 Donald Brittain at the Museum of Broadcast Communications

1928 births
1989 deaths
Officers of the Order of Canada
Film directors from Ottawa
National Film Board of Canada people
Canadian documentary film producers
Directors of Genie and Canadian Screen Award winners for Best Documentary Film
Canadian documentary film directors
Burials at Notre Dame des Neiges Cemetery